Paraferrimonas  is an iron-reducing genus of bacteria from the family of Ferrimonadaceae.

References

Alteromonadales
Bacteria genera